A renewable energy sculpture is an artwork that produces power from renewable sources, such as solar, wind, geothermal, hydroelectric or tidal.

Such a sculpture is functionally both a renewable energy generator and a work of art, fulfilling utilitarian, aesthetic, and cultural functions.  The idea of renewable energy sculptures has been developed by artists including Patrice Stellest, Sarah Hall, Julian H. Scaff, Patrick Marold, Elena Paroucheva, architects Laurie Chetwood and Nicholas Grimshaw, University of Illinois professor Bil Becket, and collaborations such as the Land Art Generator Initiative.  Echoing the philosophy of the environmental art movement as a whole, artists creating renewable energy sculpture believe that the aesthetics of the artworks are inextricably linked to their ecological function.

See also
Sustainable art
Environmental art

Further reading
 The Art Gallery of Renewable Energy, http://www.lope.ca/artrenewable/index.html
 Izzy Fraser-Underhill, Aeolian art for a more beautiful landscape, Electrical tester, copyright 2015
 Kastner, Jeffrey, Land and Environmental Art, Phaidon, copyright 2005
 Grande, John K., Balance: Art and Nature, Black Rose Books, NY, copyright 1994
 Grande, John K., Art Nature Dialogues: Interviews with Environmental Artists, State University of New York Press, copyright 2004
 Strewlow, Heike, Ecological Aesthetics: Art in Environmental Design: Theory and Practice, Birhäuser Basel, copyright 2004
 Koh, Rachel; Monoian, Elizabeth; Ferry, Robert, The Time is Now: Public Art of the Sustainable City, Land Art Generator Initiative, Page One Publishing, copyright 2012
 Monoian, Ferry, Klein, Regenerative Infrastructures: Land Art Generator Initiative, Prestel Publishing, copyright 2013
 Monoian, Elizabeth; Ferry, Robert, New Energies: Land Art Generator Initiative, Prestel Publishing, copyright 2014

Sculpture
Renewable energy
Environmental art
Modern art